Adrienne W. Kolb is an American historian of science who worked for many years as the archivist and historian at Fermilab.

Education and career
Kolb studied history at the University of New Orleans, graduating in 1972. She came to Fermilab as an assistant to Lillian Hoddeson in 1983, and retired in 2015.

Books
With Hoddeson and Catherine Westfall, Kolb is the coauthor of the book Fermilab: Physics, the Frontier, and Megascience (University of Chicago Press, 2008).

With Hoddeson and Michael Riordan, Kolb is the coauthor of Tunnel Visions: The Rise and Fall of the Superconducting Super Collider (University of Chicago Press, 2015).

Personal life
Kolb is married to Edward ("Rocky") Kolb, a professor of physics at the University of Chicago.

References

Year of birth missing (living people)
Living people
American historians of science
American women historians
University of New Orleans alumni
21st-century American women